Kari Risvik (13 June 1932 – 6 November 2021) was a Norwegian translator, one of the most productive translators of literature into Norwegian language. She has translated books from several languages, including English, Spanish and German.

She received the Fritt Ord Honorary Award in 1996, for bringing works by Salman Rushdie into Norwegian. She was awarded the Brage Honorary Prize, in 2006, along with her husband Kjell Risvik.

Risvik died on 6 November 2021.

References

1932 births
2021 deaths
Norwegian women writers
Norwegian translators
Translators to Norwegian
Translators from English
Translators from Spanish
Translators from German